DZEL (1260 AM) Radyo Agila is a radio station owned and operated by the Eagle Broadcasting Corporation in the Philippines. The station's studio and transmitter are located at Brgy. Mayao Silangan, Lucena.

References

Radio stations in Lucena, Philippines
Radio stations established in 1973
Iglesia ni Cristo